Granyena may refer to:

Granyena de Segarra, village in the comarca of Segarra
Granyena de les Garrigues, village in the comarca of Garrigues